Lin Chuangyi (Chinese: 林创益; Pinyin: Lín Chuàngyì; born 28 January 1993) is a Chinese football player who currently plays for Chinese Super League side Cangzhou Mighty Lions.

Club career
Lin started his professional football career in 2011 when he was promoted to Shanghai Zobon's squad for the 2011 China League Two campaign. He joined Chinese Super League's newcomer Shanghai Dongya in 2013. On 8 March 2013, he made his Super League debut for Shanghai Dongya, in a 4–1 away defeat against Beijing Guoan, coming on as a substitute for Lü Wenjun in the 67th minute. On 21 May 2013, Lin scored his first goal and provided an assist for Shanghai Dongya in the third round of 2013 Chinese FA Cup which Shanghai beat Chongqing Lifan in the penalty shootout. Failing to establish himself in the striker position, he swifted to winger, attacking midfielder and defensive midfielder under manager Sven-Göran Eriksson and to full-back under manager André Villas-Boas. On 14 April 2018, Lin scored his second goal for the club in the last group stage match of 2018 AFC Champions League which Shanghai SIPG lost to Melbourne Victory 2–1.

Career statistics 
Statistics accurate as of match played 31 December 2020.

Honours

Club
Shanghai SIPG
Chinese Super League: 2018
Chinese FA Super Cup: 2019

References

External links
 

1993 births
Living people
Chinese footballers
People from Shantou
Footballers from Shantou
Pudong Zobon players
Shanghai Port F.C. players
Cangzhou Mighty Lions F.C. players
Association football forwards
China League Two players
Chinese Super League players